Mohammad Yusuf, Muhammad Yousuf and other spellings, may refer to:

Politicians
 Mohammad Yusuf (politician), prime minister and foreign minister of Afghanistan
 Mohammad Yousef, a governor of Daykundi of Province, Afghanistan
 Muhammad Yusuf Abdullah Haroon, politician from Sindh, Pakistan. 
 Mohamed Yusuf Haji (born 1940), Somali politician and Kenyan Member of Parliament

Sports players
 Mohamed Yusuf (athlete) (born 1968), Indonesian Olympic sprinter
 Mohammad Yousuf (cricketer) born 1974), Pakistani former international cricketer.
 Mohammed Yousuf (snooker player), Pakistani former snooker player

Others
 Mohammed Yusuf (Boko Haram), Nigerian sect leader of Boko Haram (1970-2009)
 Mohamed Yusuf (1876–1965), Indian businessman
 Mohammad Yousuf Azraq, Afghan historian and writer
 Muhammad Yusuf Kandhalawi (born 1917), Muslim scholar from South Asia
 Muhammad Yousuf Khan (born 1922), also known as Dilip Kumar, Indian film actor 
 Yusaf Khan (general), Muhammad Yusaf Khan, former Vice Chief of Pakistan Army Staff

See also
 Muhammad (disambiguation)
 Muhammad (name)
 Yousuf